The Benpres Building (Tagalog: Gusaling Benpres), originally known as the Chronicle Building, was a six-story Filipino modernist heritage building built in 1969 and inaugurated in 1971, located in Ortigas Center, Pasig.

The building was designed by architect Gabriel Formoso and built in 1969 to serve as the new headquarters of the Manila Chronicle. The newspaper formally transferred to the building in February 1971 and the building was formally dedicated on April 2, 1971. However, President Ferdinand Marcos' declaration of Martial Law less than two years later saw the closure of the Chronicle, and the newspaper did not return to the building even after Marcos was deposed.  After the People Power Revolution of 1986, the building was returned to the Lopez family and was renamed the Benpres Building after Eugenio Lopez, Sr.'s parents—former Iloilo governor Benito López, and Presentación Hofileña López.

In 2016, the Lopez group of companies announced its intentions to redevelop the property on which the Benpres building stood, with two buildings planned to rise on the property. The building was demolished in 2019.

References 

Buildings and structures in Pasig
Ortigas Center
Buildings and structures completed in 1969
Demolished buildings and structures in the Philippines
Buildings and structures demolished in 2019